Jatin Sarna (born 2 November 1984) is an Indian actor who appears in Hindi films and theatre. He is best known for his work in Meeruthiya Gangsters, Saat Uchakkey, Sonchiriya, Darbar, 83 and Sacred Games, an original Netflix series, Khakee: The Bihar Chapter. Jatin is known for his work with several Bollywood film directors such as Anurag Kashyap, Vikramaditya Motwane, AR Murugadoss, Hansal Mehta, Abhishek Chaubey, Kanu Behl and Kabir Khan.

Personal life 
Jatin was born and brought up in a Punjabi family in New Delhi, India. He is a commerce graduate and did his B.Com from Delhi University.

Career 
After completing his acting course from Shri Ram Centre for Performing Arts, Jatin acted in several plays including Spartacus, The Seagull, Hamlet, Veer Abhimanyu, Gangster Samiti, Khidki and Maharathi. He has acted in more than 25 plays. His play Gangster Samiti got tremendous response from both the audiences and critics. He acted in the television series Zindagi Dot Com, Faujji...The Iron Man and Kyunki Jeena Isi Ka Naam Hai. He also appeared in a TV commercial for Murugappa Group.

Jatin's first film role came in director Rakesh Ranjan Kumar's Dear Friend Hitler (2011), which was released as Gandhi to Hitler in India. He next appeared as Javed in Oass in 2012. In the same year he acted in a short film, A Perfect Murder, which won numerous awards at the Delhi 48 Hour Film Project including Best Actor award for Jatin. He then made brief appearances in films like Chor Chor Super Chor, O Teri and Unfreedom, however none of the films could garner the needed attention.

In 2015, he bagged a key role in Zeishan Quadri's Meeruthiya Gangsters, which had an ensemble cast including Jaideep Ahlawat, Aakash Dahiya, Nushrat Bharucha, Sanjay Mishra and Mukul Dev. His portrayal of Sanjay 'Foreigner' in the film got him rave reviews. In 2016, he appeared in writer director Sanjeev Sharma's Saat Uchakkey as Babbe Tashni. Despite having a stellar cast of Manoj Bajpayee, Vijay Raaz, Kay Kay Menon, Annu Kapoor and Anupam Kher, the film failed to impress the critics as well as the audiences.

He recently appeared in On Camera with Ravie and shared his experiences and journey in Bollywood. On 8 July 2017, the Delhi premiere of his award winning short film Rage, written and directed by Ashish Balraj Sharma, was held at Instituto Cervantes, Connaught Place, New Delhi, as a part of Whatashort Independent International Film Festival.

His breakthrough performance came in the form of Deepak "Bunty" Shinde in Sacred Games, an original Netflix series directed by Anurag Kashyap and Vikramaditya Motwane. It is based on Sacred Games (novel) by Vikram Chandra (novelist). Jatin's portrayal of Bunty, the hot headed, abusive, misogynist yet loyal right hand man of Ganesh Gaitonde (Nawazuddin Siddiqui) made him an overnight sensation. He is all set to thrill the audience with his new web series titled Dark 7 White.

Filmography

Television/Web

Theatre plays

References

External links 

 
 

1984 births
Living people
21st-century Indian male actors
Indian theatre directors
People from New Delhi
Indian male film actors